The Oakland Athletics' 2012 season was the organization's 45th in Oakland, California and the 112th in club history. The team finished with a final record of 94–68, claiming first place in the American League West and reaching the postseason for the first time since 2006. After winning their last game of the season, they took sole possession of the West for the first time all year, overtaking the Texas Rangers. The A's had trailed Texas by 13 games on June 30, and had a five-game deficit with nine days left in the season. The 2012 team, which led the league with 15 walk-off wins, managed this with the second-lowest payroll in baseball, at $59.5 million. They lost in five games to the Detroit Tigers in the Divisional Series.

Season summary

Following a 74-88 finish in 2011, general manager Billy Beane largely dismantled the team's starting rotation. All-Star starters Trevor Cahill and Gio González were traded to the Arizona Diamondbacks and Washington Nationals, respectively. The trades yielded a number of highly touted prospects; among these were catcher Derek Norris, starting pitchers Tommy Milone, Brad Peacock and Jarrod Parker, and reliever Ryan Cook. An additional trade sent All-Star closer Andrew Bailey (along with Ryan Sweeney) to the Boston Red Sox in exchange for outfielder Josh Reddick and a pair of prospects. With power-hitting outfielder Josh Willingham becoming a free agent, Beane's next move was to sign highly regarded Cuban outfielder Yoenis Céspedes on February 13, 2012. The 4-year, $36 million deal seemed out of character, especially given the Athletics' low payroll and generally frugal nature. The move followed a number of earlier (and lower-cost) free-agent signings, including the additions of veterans Jonny Gomes, Seth Smith, and Bartolo Colón.

Despite these additions, expectations were still not high for the Athletics in 2012, as a number of experts picked the Athletics to lose as many as 100 games in the highly competitive AL West. The A's managed to play winning baseball through mid-May and held a 22–21 record on May 21, before a nine-game losing streak brought them down to a season-low eight games under the .500 mark. In Bob Melvin's first full season as manager, the team began to gel in the month of June. Between June 2 (the day the nine-game losing streak ended) and June 30, the A's posted a 15–12 record; then erased their deficit with a 19-5 surge in July, highlighted by the first-ever four-game sweep of the New York Yankees in Oakland. This stellar play put the once-dead Athletics into the heat of the AL West race: while they had trailed the division-leading Rangers by 13 games on June 30, they were only 3.5 back on July 28. A 5–8 start to August, however, widened the Rangers' lead to six games. Additionally, veteran pitcher Bartolo Colón was suspended after testing positive for synthetic testosterone on August 22. Facing these problems, the A's won 13 of their final 15 August games, due in part to the season debut of injured ace Brett Anderson and capped off with a 20–2 victory over the Boston Red Sox on August 31.

The A's continued to play well through the first days of September, though they began to decline as the month progressed. On September 5, Opening Day starter Brandon McCarthy was seriously injured when a line drive impacted his head. The injury, which resulted in an epidural hemorrhage, a brain contusion, and a skull fracture, was considered life-threatening for a number of days. Although McCarthy made a recovery over the following two months, the injury ended his season. An additional injury to Brett Anderson further impacted the A's starting rotation. From September 13 to 24 the A's would lose six out of eight games, with the final loss being a 5–4 defeat at the hands of the Rangers that put the A's five games behind the division leaders (with only nine left to play), though the A's were not mathematically eliminated. After winning two of their next three games against the Rangers, they then swept the Seattle Mariners (highlighted by their last regular-season walk-off), while the Rangers lost two games out of three to the division-rival Los Angeles Angels. With the Rangers leading the A's by only two games, the teams faced off in Oakland for the final three games of the season. The A's took the first two games by scores of 4-3 and 3–1, respectively; the first win clinched a postseason berth for the Athletics, while the second momentarily tied the A's with the Rangers for first place and set up a winner-take-all game for the division crown. In the final game, a 5-1 Rangers lead after the 2nd inning was not enough as the Athletics scored six runs in the 4th (including two off a fly ball that was misplayed by Josh Hamilton) and scored five more runs in the eventual 12–5 victory.

Having secured the division championship, the Athletics faced the Detroit Tigers in the 2012 American League Division Series. The A's were shut down by Detroit ace Justin Verlander in Game 1, and followed that loss with a 5–4 defeat in Game 2. The Athletics, now down 2–0 in a best-of-five series, returned to Oakland for Game 3. Brett Anderson saved the Athletics' season by shutting out the Tigers in a 2-0 Athletics victory. Then, trailing 3-1 heading into the bottom of the 9th inning, Oakland scored three runs (the final on a Coco Crisp walk-off single) to capture a come-from-behind 4–3 victory in Game 4. The A's comeback was not to be, however, as a dominant outing by Verlander ended the A's season in Game 5.

The Athletics' 94–68 record in 2012 was their best in nearly a decade. Manager Bob Melvin and General Manager Billy Beane were honored with the Greatness in Baseball Yearly (GIBBY) Award as the Manager of the Year and  Executive of the Year, respectively.

Regular season

American League West

American League Wild Card

Record against opponents

Offseason
 At the end of the regular season, the club quickly dismissed bench coach Joel Skinner, pitching coach Ron Romanick, and hitting coach Gerald Perry. 
 Oakland received outfield prospect Eliezer Mesa from Colorado as the "player to be named later" from the Mark Ellis trade on June 30.
 On October 4, 2011, Mets' third base coach Chip Hale signed a two-year deal to become bench coach under Bob Melvin. 
 After spending one year in Boston, pitching coach Curt Young returned on October 21 on a one-year deal. 
 On October 25, 2011, right-handed pitcher Evan Scribner and outfielder Cedric Hunter were claimed off waivers from San Diego and later outrighted to AAA. That same day, RHP Michael Wuertz was released. 
 On November 4, 2011, RHP Trystan Magnuson was designated for assignment and traded back to Toronto for cash considerations. 
 On November 18, outfielder Jermaine Mitchell was protected from the Rule 5 draft by being added to the 40-man roster. 
 Former big leaguer Chili Davis was named the A's new hitting coach on November 25, 2011. 
 On December 9, 2011, the team traded pitchers Trevor Cahill and Craig Breslow to Arizona for pitchers Jarrod Parker and Ryan Cook and outfielder Collin Cowgill.
 Next to go were pitchers Gio González and minor leaguer Robert Gilliam, traded to Washington on December 23, 2011, for pitchers A. J. Cole, Tommy Milone, and Brad Peacock, and catcher Derek Norris. 
 To make room for the prospects yielded in the Gonzalez trade, on December 23 assignment designations were given to outfielder Jai Miller (traded to Baltimore) and catcher Landon Powell (cleared waiver and assigned to AAA).
 On December 28, 2011, former closer Andrew Bailey and outfielder Ryan Sweeney were dealt to the Boston Red Sox in exchange for outfielder Josh Reddick and minor-leaguers Miles Head and Raúl Alcántara.
 Outfielder Coco Crisp re-signed with the team on January 3, 2012, on a two-year, $14 million deal. 
 In January, the Athletics signed pitcher Bartolo Colón (January 14) and outfielder Jonny Gomes (January 20). Infielder Adrian Cárdenas was removed from the 40-man roster in favor of Gomes on January 26; Cardenas was claimed off waivers by the Chicago Cubs the next month.
 On January 16, 2012, A's traded pitchers Josh Outman and Guillermo Moscoso to Colorado for outfielder Seth Smith. 
 On February 20, the team signed Manny Ramirez to a minor league contract. 
 On March 3, 2012, the team announced the official signing of defecting Cuban outfielder Yoenis Céspedes to a 4-year, $36 million contract.

Notable 2011 Departures

Stats as of Aug 25

Roster

Game log 

|-  style="text-align:center; background:#fbb;"
| 1 || March 28 || Mariners (@ Tokyo, Japan) || 1–3 (11) || Wilhemsen (1–0) || Carignan (0–1) || League (1) || 44,227 || 0–1 
|- style="text-align:center; background:#bfb;"
| 2 || March 29 || Mariners (@ Tokyo, Japan)|| 4–1 || Colón (1–0) || Kelley (0–1)  || Balfour (1) || 43,391 || 1–1
|- style="text-align:center; background:#fbb;"
| 3 || April 6 || Mariners || 3–7 || Vargas (1–0) || McCarthy (0–1) || || 35,067 || 1–2
|- style="text-align:center; background:#fbb;"
| 4 || April 7 || Mariners || 7–8 || Hernández (1–0) || Colón (1–1) || League (2) || 16,612 || 1–3
|- style="text-align:center; background:#bfb;"
| 5 || April 9 || Royals || 1–0 || Milone (1–0) || Mendoza (0–1) || Balfour (2) || 10,054 || 2–3
|- style="text-align:center; background:#fbb;"
| 6 || April 10 || Royals || 0–3 (8) || Duffy (1–0) || Godfrey (0–1) || Crow (1) || 10,670 || 2–4
|- style="text-align:center; background:#bfb;"
| 7 || April 11 || Royals || 5–4 (12) || Carignan (1–1) || Broxton (0–1) || || 12,390 || 3–4
|- style="text-align:center; background:#bfb;"
| 8 || April 13 || @ Mariners || 4–0 || Colón (2–1) || Hernández (1–1) || || 46,026 || 4–4
|- style="text-align:center; background:#fbb;"
| 9 || April 14 || @ Mariners || 0–4 || Noesí (1–1) || Milone (1–1) || || 21,071 || 4–5
|- style="text-align:center; background:#fbb;"
| 10 || April 15 || @ Mariners || 3–5 || Beavan (1–1) || Godfrey (0–2) ||League (4) || 19,650 || 4–6
|- style="text-align:center; background:#fbb;"
| 11 || April 16 || @ Angels || 0–6 || Weaver (2–0) || McCarthy (0–2) || || 27,338 || 4–7
|- style="text-align:center; background:#bfb;"
| 12 || April 17 || @ Angels || 5–3 || Fuentes (1–0) || Jepsen (0–1) || Balfour (3) || 41,016 || 5–7
|- style="text-align:center; background:#bfb;"
| 13 || April 18 || @ Angels || 6–0 || Colón (3–1) || Santana (0–3) || || 27,217 || 6–7
|- style="text-align:center; background:#bfb;"
| 14 || April 19 || @ Angels || 4–2 || Milone (2–1) || Wilson (2–1) || Balfour (4) || 27,864 || 7–7
|- style="text-align:center; background:#fbb;"
| 15 || April 20 || Indians || 3–4 || Jiménez (2–0) || Godfrey (0–3) || Perez (5) || 14,340 || 7–8
|- style="text-align:center; background:#fbb;"
| 16 || April 21 || Indians || 1–5 || Gómez (1–0) || McCarthy (0–3) || Perez (6) || 25,258 || 7–9
|- style="text-align:center; background:#bfb;"
| 17 || April 22 || Indians || 5–1 || Ross (1–0) || Masterson (0–2) || || 24,049 || 8–9
|- style="text-align:center; background:#fbb;"
| 18 || April 23 || White Sox || 0–4 || Peavy (3–0) || Colón (3–2) || || 10,574  || 8–10
|- style="text-align:center; background:#bfb;"
| 19 || April 24 || White Sox || 2–0 || Milone (3–1) || Floyd (1–3) || Balfour (5) || 11,184 || 9–10
|- style="text-align:center; background:#bfb;"
| 20 || April 25 || White Sox || 5–4 (14) || Miller (1–0) || Santiago (0–1) || || 13,032 || 10–10
|- style="text-align:center; background:#bfb;"
| 21 || April 27 || @ Orioles || 5–2 || McCarthy (1–3) || Arrieta (1–2) || Balfour (6) || 18,297 || 11–10
|- style="text-align:center; background:#fbb;"
| 22 || April 28 || @ Orioles || 1–10 || Chen (2–0) || Ross (1–1) || || 26,926 || 11–11
|- style="text-align:center; background:#fbb;"
| 23 || April 29 || @ Orioles || 2–5 || Strop (3–1) || Balfour (0–1) || || 31,793 || 11–12
|- style="text-align:center; background:#fbb;"
| 24 || April 30 || @ Red Sox || 6–11 || Buchholz (3–1) || Milone (3–2) || || 37,359 || 11–13
|-

|- style="text-align:center; background:#bfb;"
| 25 || May 1 || @ Red Sox || 5–3 || Parker (1–0) || Doubront (1–1) || Norberto (1) || 37,225 || 12–13
|- style="text-align:center; background:#bfb;"
| 26 || May 2 || @ Red Sox || 4–2 || McCarthy (2–3) || Bard (2–3) || Fuentes (1) || 37,434 || 13–13
|- style="text-align:center; background:#fbb;"
| 27 || May 4 || @ Rays || 2–7 || Price (5–1) || Ross (1–2) || Peralta (2) || 18,799 || 13–14
|- style="text-align:center; background:#bfb;"
| 28 || May 5 || @ Rays || 4–3 (12) || Fuentes (2–0) || Peralta (0–1) || Balfour (7) || 23,890 || 14–14
|- style="text-align:center; background:#bfb;"
| 29 || May 6 || @ Rays || 9–5 || Milone (4–2) || Moore (1–2) || || 23,873 || 15–14
|- style="text-align:center; background:#bfb;"
| 30 || May 8 || Blue Jays || 7–3 || Balfour (1–1) || Cordero (1–2) || || 10,784 || 16–14
|- style="text-align:center; background:#fbb;"
| 31 || May 9 || Blue Jays || 2–5 || Morrow (4–1) || Ross (2–2) || Janssen (1) || 14,815 || 16–15
|- style="text-align:center; background:#fbb;"
| 32 || May 10 || Tigers || 6–10 || Scherzer (2–3) || Colón (3–3) || || 11,513 || 16–16
|- style="text-align:center; background:#bfb;"
| 33 || May 11 || Tigers || 11–4 || Milone (5–2) || Porcello (3–3) || || 26,721 || 17–16
|- style="text-align:center; background:#bfb;"
| 34 || May 12 || Tigers || 3–1 || McCarthy (3–3) || Fister (0–1) || Fuentes (2) || 20,077 || 18–16
|- style="text-align:center; background:#fbb;"
| 35 || May 13 || Tigers || 1–3 || Verlander (4–1) || Parker (1–1) || Valverde (7) || 17,147 || 18–17
|- style="text-align:center; background:#bfb;"
| 36 || May 14 || @ Angels || 5–0 || Ross (2–3) || Haren (1–4) || || 32,851 || 19–17
|- style="text-align:center; background:#fbb;"
| 37 || May 15 || @ Angels || 0–4 || Santana (2–6) || Colón (3–4) || || 31,762 || 19–18
|- style="text-align:center; background:#fbb;"
| 38 || May 16 || @ Rangers || 1–4 || Darvish (6–1) || Milone (5–3) || Nathan (8) || 46,370 || 19–19
|- style="text-align:center; background:#bfb;"
| 39 || May 17 || @ Rangers || 5–4 (10) || Cook (1–0) || Adams (0–2) || Fuentes (3) || 47,182 || 20–19
|- style="text-align:center; background:#fbb;"
| 40 || May 18 || @ Giants || 6–8 || Zito (3–1) || Parker (1–2) || Casilla (10) || 41,477 || 20–20
|- style="text-align:center; background:#fbb;"
| 41 || May 19 || @ Giants || 0–4 || Vogelsong (2–2) || Ross (2–4) || || 41,411 || 20–21
|- style="text-align:center; background:#bfb;"
| 42 || May 20 || @ Giants || 6–2 || Colón (4–4) || Lincecum (2–4) || || 41,378 || 21–21
|- style="text-align:center; background:#bfb;"
| 43 || May 21 || Angels || 2–1 || Milone (6–3) || Williams (4–2) || Fuentes (4) || 11,292 || 22–21
|- style="text-align:center; background:#fbb;"
| 44 || May 22 || Angels || 0–5 || Wilson (5–4) || Godfrey (0–4) || || 12,894 || 22–22
|- style="text-align:center; background:#fbb;"
| 45 || May 23 || Angels || 1–3 (11) || Walden (1–1) || Norberto (0–1) || Frieri (1) || 23,617 || 22–23
|- style="text-align:center; background:#fbb;"
| 46 || May 25 || Yankees || 3–6 || Nova (5–2) || Ross (2–5) || Soriano (4) || 33,559 || 22–24
|- style="text-align:center; background:#fbb;"
| 47 || May 26 || Yankees || 2–9 || Sabathia (6–2) || Colón (4–5) || || 27,112 || 22–25
|- style="text-align:center; background:#fbb;"
| 48 || May 27 || Yankees || 0–2 || Kuroda (4–6) || Milone (6–4) || Soriano (5) || 25,078 || 22–26
|- style="text-align:center; background:#fbb;"
| 49 || May 28 || @ Twins || 4–5 || Burnett (2–0) || Cook (1–1) || Capps (10) || 34,709 || 22–27
|- style="text-align:center; background:#fbb;"
| 50 || May 29 || @ Twins || 2–3 || Perkins (2–1) || Fuentes (2–1) || || 31,781 || 22–28
|- style="text-align:center; background:#fbb;"
| 51 || May 30 || @ Twins || 0–4 || Liriano (1–5) || Ross (2–6) || || 35,103 || 22–29
|-

|- style="text-align:center; background:#fbb;"
| 52 || June 1 || @ Royals || 0–2 || Paulino (3–1) || Colón (4–6) || Broxton (12) || 29,527 || 22–30
|- style="text-align:center; background:#bfb;"
| 53 || June 2 || @ Royals || 9–3 || McCarthy (4–3) || Hochevar (3–6) || || 26,276 || 23–30
|- style="text-align:center; background:#fbb;"
| 54 || June 3 || @ Royals || 0–2 || Mazzaro (2–0) || Milone (6–5) || Broxton (13) || 21,111 || 23–31
|- style="text-align:center; background:#bfb;"
| 55 || June 4 || Rangers || 12–1 || Parker (2–2) || Feldman (0–4) || || 10,120 || 24–31
|- style="text-align:center; background:#fbb;"
| 56 || June 5 || Rangers || 3–6 || Holland (5–4) || Blackley (0–1) || Nathan (12) || 11,861 || 24–32
|- style="text-align:center; background:#bfb;"
| 57 || June 6 || Rangers || 2–0 || Colón (5–6) || Lewis (4–5) || Fuentes (5) || 15,044 || 25–32
|- style="text-align:center; background:#bfb;"
| 58 || June 7 || Rangers || 7–1 || McCarthy (5–3) || Darvish (7–4) || || 14,779 || 26–32
|- style="text-align:center; background:#fbb;"
| 59 || June 8 || @ Diamondbacks || 8–9 || Putz (1–3) || Fuentes (2–2) || || 25,787 || 26–33
|- style="text-align:center; background:#fbb;"
| 60 || June 9 || @ Diamondbacks || 3–8 || Cahill (4–5) || Parker (2–3) || || 28,061 || 26–34
|- style="text-align:center; background:#fbb;"
| 61 || June 10 || @ Diamondbacks || 3–4 || Saunders (4–4) || Blackley (0–2) || Putz (13) || 28,112 || 26–35
|- style="text-align:center; background:#bfb;"
| 62 || June 12 || @ Rockies || 8–5 || Colón (6–6) || Guthrie (3–5) || Cook (1) || 33,635 || 27–35
|- style="text-align:center; background:#bfb;"
| 63 || June 13 || @ Rockies || 10–8 || Blevins (1–0) || Betancourt (1–2) || Cook (2) || 32,155 || 28–35
|- style="text-align:center; background:#bfb;"
| 64 || June 14 || @ Rockies || 8–2 || Parker (3–3) || White (2–5) || || 32,527 || 29–35
|- style="text-align:center; background:#bfb;"
| 65 || June 15 || Padres || 10–2 || Blackley (1–2) || Bass (2–7) || Scribner (1) || 24,528 || 30–35
|- style="text-align:center; background:#bfb;"
| 66 || June 16 || Padres || 6–4 || Doolittle (1–0) || Thatcher (0–2) || Cook (3) || 17,135 || 31–35
|- style="text-align:center; background:#fbb;"
| 67 || June 17 || Padres || 1–2 || Richard (4–7) || Colón (6–7) || Street (8) || 21,631 || 31–36
|- style="text-align:center; background:#bfb;"
| 68 || June 19 || Dodgers || 3–0 || McCarthy (6–3) || Harang (5–4) || Cook (4) || 20,244 || 32–36
|- style="text-align:center; background:#bfb;"
| 69 || June 20 || Dodgers || 4–1 || Milone (7–5) || Eovaldi (0–3) || || 25,383 || 33–36
|- style="text-align:center; background:#bfb;"
| 70 || June 21 || Dodgers || 4–1 || Cook (2–1) || Lindblom (2–1) || || 23,337 || 34–36
|- style="text-align:center; background:#fbb;"
| 71 || June 22 || Giants || 4–5 || Hensley (3–3) || Cook (2–2) || Casilla (20) || 35,067 || 34–37
|- style="text-align:center; background:#fbb;"
| 72 || June 23 || Giants || 8–9 || Bumgarner (9–4) || Ross (2–7) || Hensley (2) || 36,067 || 34–38
|- style="text-align:center; background:#bfb;"
| 73 || June 24 || Giants || 4–2 || Miller (2–0) || Casilla (1–3) || || 36,067 || 35–38
|- style="text-align:center; background:#bfb;"
| 74 || June 25 || @ Mariners || 1–0 || Milone (8–5) || Ramírez (0–2) || Cook (5) || 17,101 || 36–38
|- style="text-align:center; background:#fbb;"
| 75 || June 26 || @ Mariners || 2–3 || Furbush (4–1) || Miller (2–1) || Wilhelmsen (6) || 12,411 || 36–39
|- style="text-align:center; background:#bfb;"
| 76 || June 27 || @ Mariners || 2–1 || Parker (4–3) || Iwakuma (1–1) || Cook (6) || 18,158 || 37–39
|- style="text-align:center; background:#fbb;"
| 77 || June 28 || @ Rangers || 6–7 || Feldman (2–6) || Ross (2–8) || Nathan (18) || 33,927 || 37–40
|- style="text-align:center; background:#fbb;"
| 78 || June 29 || @ Rangers || 3–4 || Harrison (11–3) || Balfour (1–2) || Scheppers (1) || 46,013 || 37–41
|- style="text-align:center; background:#fbb;"
| 79 || June 30 || @ Rangers || 2–7 || Pérez (1–0) || Milone (8–6) || || 46,711 || 37–42
|-

|- style="text-align:center; background:#bfb;"
| 80 || July 1 || @ Rangers || 3–1 || Blackley (2–2) || Darvish (10–5) || Cook (7) || 45,741 || 38–42
|- style="text-align:center; background:#bfb;"
| 81 || July 2 || Red Sox || 6–1 || Parker (5–3) || Matsuzaka (0–3) || || 17,434 || 39–42
|- style="text-align:center; background:#bfb;"
| 82 || July 3 || Red Sox || 3–2 || Blevins (2–0) || Aceves (0–6) || || 35,067 || 40–42
|- style="text-align:center; background:#bfb;"
| 83 || July 4 || Red Sox || 3–2 || Balfour (2–2) || Cook (2–2) || Cook (8) || 28,240 || 41–42
|- style="text-align:center; background:#bfb;"
| 84 || July 6 || Mariners || 4–1 (11) || Norberto (1–1) || Pérez (0–1) || || 10,819 || 42–42
|- style="text-align:center; background:#fbb;"
| 85 || July 7 || Mariners || 1–7 || Vargas (8–7) || Parker (5–4) || || 16,136 || 42–43
|- style="text-align:center; background:#bfb;"
| 86 || July 8 || Mariners || 2–1 (13) || Norberto (2–1) || Pérez (0–2) || || 20,075 || 43–43
|- style="text-align:center; background:#bfb;"
| 87 || July 13 || @ Twins || 6–3 || Griffin (1–0) || Liriano (3–8) || Cook (9) || 33,230 || 44–43
|- style="text-align:center; background:#bfb;"
| 88 || July 14 || @ Twins || 9–3 || Milone (9–6) || De Vries (2–2) || || 39,084 || 45–43
|- style="text-align:center; background:#bfb;"
| 89 || July 15 || @ Twins || 9–4 || Parker (6–4) || Duensing (1–6) || || 36,583 || 46–43
|- style="text-align:center; background:#fbb;"
| 90 || July 17 || Rangers || 1–6 || Oswalt (3–1) || Colón (6–8) || || 15,115 || 46–44
|- style="text-align:center; background:#bfb;"
| 91 || July 18 || Rangers || 4–3 || Cook (3–2) || Kirkman (0–1) || || 20,249 || 47–44 
|- style="text-align:center; background:#bfb;"
| 92 || July 19 || Yankees || 4–3 || Griffin (2–0) || García (4–3) || Cook (10) || 23,382 || 48–44
|- style="text-align:center; background:#bfb;"
| 93 || July 20 || Yankees || 3–2 || Cook (4–2) || Eppley (0–1) || || 24,148 || 49–44
|- style="text-align:center; background:#bfb;"
| 94 || July 21 || Yankees || 2–1 || Parker (7–4) || Hughes (9–8) || Doolittle (1) || 28,142 || 50–44
|- style="text-align:center; background:#bfb;"
| 95 || July 22 || Yankees || 5–4 (12) || Blevins (3–0) || Eppley (0–2) || || 30,470 || 51–44
|- style="text-align:center; background:#bfb;"
| 96 || July 24 || @ Blue Jays || 7–2 || Blackley (3–2) || Cecil (2–3) || || 25,686 || 52–44
|- style="text-align:center; background:#bfb;"
| 97 || July 25 || @ Blue Jays || 16–0 || Griffin (3–0) || Romero (8–7) || || 23,948 || 53–44
|- style="text-align:center; background:#fbb;"
| 98 || July 26 || @ Blue Jays || 4–10 || Lyon (1–2) || Milone (9–7) || || 39,003 || 53–45
|- style="text-align:center; background:#bfb;"
| 99 || July 27 || @ Orioles || 14–9 || Blevins (4–0) || Johnson (1–1) || || 29,278 || 54–45
|- style="text-align:center; background:#bfb;"
| 100 || July 28 || @ Orioles || 6–1 || Colón (7–8) || Hunter (4–6) || || 21,143 || 55–45
|- style="text-align:center; background:#fbb;"
| 101 || July 29 || @ Orioles || 1–6 || Chen (9–6) || Blackley (3–3) || || 19,698 || 55–46
|- style="text-align:center; background:#bfb;"
| 102 || July 30 || Rays || 4–3 (15) || Norberto (3–1) || Farnsworth (0–3) || || 12,564 || 56–46
|- style="text-align:center; background:#fbb;"
| 103 || July 31 || Rays || 0–8 || Shields (9–7) || Milone (9–8) || || 15,836 || 56–47
|-

|- style="text-align:center; background:#fbb;"
| 104 || August 1 || Rays || 1–4 || Cobb (5–8) || Parker (7–5) || Rodney (31) || 18,161 || 56–48
|- style="text-align:center; background:#bfb;"
| 105 || August 2 || Blue Jays || 4–1 || Colón (8–8) || Álvarez (7–8) || Cook (11) || 10,823 || 57–48
|- style="text-align:center; background:#bfb;"
|106 || August 3 || Blue Jays ||  5–4 (15) || Blackley (4–3) || Loup (0–2) || || 30,169 || 58–48
|- style="text-align:center; background:#fbb;"
| 107 || August 4 || Blue Jays || 1–3 (11) || Chavez (1–1) || Blevins (4–1) || Oliver (2) || 17,121 || 58–49
|- style="text-align:center; background:#fbb;"
| 108 || August 5 || Blue Jays || 5–6 || Laffey (3–2) || Milone (9–9) || Janssen (14) || 18,308 || 58–50
|- style="text-align:center; background:#fbb;"
| 109 || August 6 || Angels || 0–4 || Weaver (15–1) || Parker (7–6) || || 13,341 || 58–51
|- style="text-align:center; background:#bfb;"
| 110 || August 7 || Angels || 10–4 || Colón (9–8) || Wilson (9–8) || || 15,458 || 59–51
|- style="text-align:center; background:#bfb;"
| 111 || August 8 || Angels || 9–8 || Neshek (1–0) || Hawkins (2–3) || Cook (12) || 21,150 || 60–51
|- style="text-align:center; background:#fbb;"
| 112 || August 10 || @ White Sox || 3–4 || Myers (1–5) || Neshek (1–1) || || 25,041 || 60–52
|- style="text-align:center; background:#bfb;"
| 113 || August 11 || @ White Sox || 9–7 || Cook (5–2) || Thornton (4–8) || Balfour (8) || 26,686 || 61–52
|- style="text-align:center; background:#fbb;"
| 114 || August 12 || @ White Sox || 3–7 || Sale (14–3) || Colón (9–9) || || 25,106 || 61–53
|- style="text-align:center; background:#fbb;"
| 115 || August 14 || @ Royals || 0–5 || Guthrie (5–12) || Parker (7–7) || || 16,107 || 61–54
|- style="text-align:center; background:#fbb;"
| 116 || August 15 || @ Royals || 2–3 || Smith (4–4) || McCarthy (6–4) || Holland (4) || 15,591 || 61–55
|- style="text-align:center; background:#bfb;"
| 117 || August 16 || @ Royals || 3–0 || Straily (1–0) || Hochevar (7–11) || Balfour (9) || 14,345 || 62–55
|- style="text-align:center; background:#bfb;"
| 118 || August 17 || Indians || 6–4 || Norberto (4–1) || Smith (7–3) || Balfour (10) || 13,967 || 63–55
|- style="text-align:center; background:#bfb;"
| 119 || August 18 || Indians || 8–5 || Colón (10–9) || Kluber (0–2) || Balfour (11) || 30,132 || 64–55
|- style="text-align:center; background:#bfb;"
| 120 || August 19 || Indians || 7–0 || Parker (8–7) || Masterson (9–11) || || 20,130 || 65–55
|- style="text-align:center; background:#fbb;"
| 121 || August 20 || Twins || 2–7 || Duensing (3–8) || McCarthy (6–5) || || 10,274 || 65–56
|- style="text-align:center; background:#bfb;"
| 122 || August 21 || Twins || 4–1 || Anderson (1–0) || De Vries (2–5) || Balfour (12) || 13,116 || 66–56
|- style="text-align:center; background:#bfb;"
| 123 || August 22 || Twins || 5–1 || Milone (10–9) || Hendriks (0–6) || || 16,657 || 67–56
|- style="text-align:center; background:#fbb;"
| 124 || August 23 || @ Rays || 0–5 || Cobb (8–8) || Ross (2–9) || || 11,613 || 67–57
|- style="text-align:center; background:#bfb;"
| 125 || August 24 || @ Rays || 5–4 || Cook (6–2) || Peralta (1–6) || Balfour (13) || 18,913 || 68–57
|- style="text-align:center; background:#bfb;"
| 126 || August 25 || @ Rays || 4–2 || McCarthy (7–5) || Hellickson (8–9) || Balfour (14) || 18,187 || 69–57
|- style="text-align:center; background:#bfb;"
| 127 || August 27 || @ Indians || 3–0 || Anderson (2–0) || Hernández (0–3) || Balfour (15) || 13,018 || 70–57
|- style="text-align:center; background:#bfb;"
| 128 || August 28 || @ Indians || 7–0 || Milone (11–9) || McAllister (5–5) || || 13,413 || 71–57
|- style="text-align:center; background:#bfb;"
| 129 || August 29 || @ Indians || 8–4 || Blackley (5–3) || Kluber (0–3) || Cook (13) || 14,412 || 72–57
|- style="text-align:center; background:#bfb;"
| 130 || August 30 || @ Indians || 12–7 || Parker (9–7) || Masterson (10–12) || || 14,500 || 73–57
|- style="text-align:center; background:#bfb;"
| 131 || August 31 || Red Sox || 20–2 || McCarthy (8–5) || Cook (3–8) || || 20,121 || 74–57
|-

|- style="text-align:center; background:#bfb;"
| 132 || September 1 || Red Sox || 7–1 || Griffin (4–0) || Doubront (10–7) || || 20,315 || 75–57
|- style="text-align:center; background:#bfb;"
| 133 || September 2 || Red Sox || 6–2 || Anderson (3–0) || Matsuzaka (1–4) || || 25,314 || 76–57
|- style="text-align:center; background:#fbb;"
| 134 || September 3 || Angels || 3–8 || Wilson (11–9) || Milone (11–10) || || 20,180 || 76–58
|- style="text-align:center; background:#fbb;"
| 135 || September 4 || Angels || 1–6 || Greinke (13–5) || Parker (9–8) || || 11,688 || 76–59
|- style="text-align:center; background:#fbb;"
| 136 || September 5 || Angels || 1–7 || Haren (10–10) || McCarthy (8–6) || || 15,404 || 76–60
|- style="text-align:center; background:#bfb;"
| 137 || September 7 || @ Mariners || 6–1 || Griffin (5–0) || Hernández (13–7) || || 17,128 || 77–60
|- style="text-align:center; background:#bfb;"
| 138 || September 8 || @ Mariners || 6–1 || Anderson (4–0) || Iwakuma (6–4) || || 23,177 || 78–60
|- style="text-align:center; background:#bfb;"
| 139 || September 9 || @ Mariners || 4–2 || Milone (12–10) || Vargas (14–10) || Balfour (16) || 14,403 || 79–60
|- style="text-align:center; background:#bfb;"
| 140 || September 10 || @ Angels || 3–1 || Parker (10–8) || Haren (10–11) || Balfour (17) || 36,064 || 80–60
|- style="text-align:center; background:#bfb;"
| 141 || September 11 || @ Angels || 6–5 || Straily (2–0) || Williams (6–8) || Blevins (1) || 37,794 || 81–60
|- style="text-align:center; background:#bfb;"
| 142 || September 12 || @ Angels || 4–1 || Griffin (6–0) || Santana (8–12) || Cook (14) || 38,097 || 82–60
|-  style="text-align:center; background:#fbb;"
| 143 || September 13 || @ Angels || 0–6 || Weaver (17–4) || Anderson (4–1) || || 38,029 || 82–61
|- style="text-align:center; background:#bfb;"
| 144 || September 14 || Orioles || 3–2 || Milone (13–10) || Saunders (8–12) || Balfour (18) || 35,067 || 83–61
|- style="text-align:center; background:#bfb;"
| 145 || September 15 || Orioles || 5–2 || Parker (11–8) || Britton (5–3) || Balfour (19) || 20,342 || 84–61
|-  style="text-align:center; background:#fbb;"
| 146 || September 16 || Orioles || 5–9 || Matusz (6–10) || Straily (2–1) || Johnson (43) || 20,539 || 84–62
|-  style="text-align:center; background:#fbb;"
| 147 || September 18 || @ Tigers || 2–12 || Downs (2–1) || Griffin (6–1) || || 31,243 || 84–63
|-  style="text-align:center; background:#fbb;"
| 148 || September 19 || @ Tigers || 2–6 || Verlander (15–8) || Anderson (4–2) || || 29,734 || 84–64
|- style="text-align:center; background:#bfb;"
| 149 || September 20 || @ Tigers || 12–4 || Neshek (2–1) || Sánchez (8–13) || || 34,635 || 85–64
|-  style="text-align:center; background:#fbb;"
| 150 || September 21 || @ Yankees || 1–2 (10) || Robertson (2–7) || Doolittle (1–1) || || 40,759 || 85–65
|-  style="text-align:center; background:#fbb;"
| 151 || September 22 || @ Yankees || 9–10 (14) || Wade (1–1) || Ross (2–10) || || 44,026 || 85–66
|- style="text-align:center; background:#bfb;"
| 152 || September 23 || @ Yankees || 5–4 || Blevins (5–1) || Kuroda (14–11) || Balfour (20) || 43,867 || 86–66
|-  style="text-align:center; background:#fbb;"
| 153 || September 24 || @ Rangers || 4–5 || Nathan (3–4) || Ross (2–11) || || 43,044 || 86–67
|- style="text-align:center; background:#bfb;"
| 154 || September 25 || @ Rangers || 3–2 (10) || Scribner (1–0) || Lowe (0–2) || Balfour (21) || 43,874 || 87–67
|- style="text-align:center; background:#bfb;"
| 155 || September 26 || @ Rangers || 9–3 || Parker (12–8) || Pérez (1–3) || || 46,689 || 88–67
|-  style="text-align:center; background:#fbb;"
| 156 || September 27 || @ Rangers || 7–9 || Harrison (18–10) || Blackley (5–4) || Nathan (36) || 43,796 || 88–68
|- style="text-align:center; background:#bfb;"
| 157 || September 28 || Mariners || 8–2 || Griffin (7–1) || Beavan (10–11) || || 16,376 || 89–68
|- style="text-align:center; background:#bfb;"
| 158 || September 29 || Mariners || 7–4 (10) || Balfour (3–2) || Pérez (1–3) || || 21,517 || 90–68
|- style="text-align:center; background:#bfb;"
| 159 || September 30 || Mariners || 5–2 || Doolittle (2–1) || Kelley (2–4) || Balfour (22) || 21,057 || 91–68
|- style="text-align:center; background:#bfb;"
| 160 || October 1 || Rangers || 4–3 || Parker (13–8) || Pérez (1–4) || Balfour (23) || 21,162 || 92–68
|- style="text-align:center; background:#bfb;"
| 161 || October 2 || Rangers || 3–1 || Blackley (6–4) || Harrison (18–11) || Balfour (24) || 30,660 || 93–68
|- style="text-align:center; background:#bfb;"
| 162 || October 3 || Rangers || 12–5 || Scribner (2–0) || Holland (12–7) || || 36,067 || 94–68
|-

Postseason

Division Series

The Athletics played the Detroit Tigers in the Division Series.

Game 1, October 6
6:07 p.m. (EDT) at Comerica Park in Detroit, Michigan

Game 2, October 7
12:07 p.m. (EDT) at Comerica Park in Detroit, Michigan

Game 3, October 9
9:07 p.m. (EDT) at O.co Coliseum in Oakland, California

Game 4, October 10
9:37 p.m. (EDT) at O.co Coliseum in Oakland, California

Game 5, October 11
9:37 p.m. (EDT) at O.co Coliseum in Oakland, California

Farm System

Farm system affiliates 

In September, the organization announced a two-year player development contract with the Class A Beloit Snappers, replacing Burlington after two seasons.

Arizona Fall League
Gary Daley, Grant Green, Shawn Haviland, Miles Head, Brett Hunter, Max Stassi, James Simmons will represent the organization on the Phoenix Desert Dogs

MLB Top Prospects 

Bold has played in Oakland during 2012 season. Carter, Cowgill, Norris and Parker have been removed.

Baseball America named Céspedes (14), Parker (26), Peacock (36), Cole (57), Gray (65), and Choice (80) to their Top 100 Prospects list. Baseball Prospectus named Choice (39), Parker (50), Cole (60), Peacock (64), Gray (72), Norris (96), and Green (100) to their Top 101 Prospects list.

References

External links
2012 Oakland Athletics season at Baseball Reference
2012 Oakland Athletics season Official Site

Oakland Athletics seasons
Oakland Athletics
American League West champion seasons
2010s in Oakland, California
Oak